Darreh-ye Badam (also Romanized as Darreh-ye Bādām) is a village in Dowreh Rural District, Chegeni District, Dowreh County, Lorestan Province, Iran. At the 2006 census, its population was 584, in 133 families.

References 

Towns and villages in Dowreh County